Shanli railway station is a railway station located in Beinan Township, Taitung County, Taiwan. It is located on the Taitung line and is operated by Taiwan Railways.

References

1982 establishments in Taiwan
Railway stations opened in 1982
Railway stations in Taitung County
Railway stations served by Taiwan Railways Administration